This is a list of newspapers in Myanmar.

Daily newspapers
State-run
Kyemon (The Mirror) - a government-run daily newspaper (Burmese)
Myanma Alin (The Light of Myanmar) - a government-run daily newspaper (Burmese)
Myawady Daily - a military-run daily newspaper
New Light of Myanmar - a government-run daily newspaper formerly named The Working People's Daily (Burmese and English) 
The Yadanabon - a military-run daily newspaper

Private
7 Day News (Burmese)
China Daily Global Edition - a private daily English Newspaper (English)
D-Wave (owned by National League for Democracy)
Daily Eleven 
Empire Daily
Golden Fresh Land
The Messenger
Myanmar Business Today
The Myanmar Times - a private daily English newspaper (weekly in Burmese)
The Standard Time Daily
The Straits Times Myanmar Edition - a private daily newspaper (English)
The Union Daily (owned by Union Solidarity and Development Party)
The Voice Daily
The Yangon Times

Weekly newspapers and journals
A-Myin-thit - Ministry of Interior, special branch weekly newspaper (Burmese)
BiWeekly Eleven
Burma Today (Burmese)
The Commerce Journal
Education Digest Journal (Burmese)
First Eleven Sports Journal
Flower News - private weekly newspaper (Burmese) 
Frontier Myanmar (English) 
Internet Journal (English and Burmese)
Kanaung Journal of Industry and Commerce 
Kumudra (Burmese) 
Hmukhin Shudaunk (Crime Journal) (Burmese)
Myanmar Business Today - Myanmar's first bilingual (English-Myanmar) business newspaper
Myanmar Digest 
Myanmar Post - privately owned
Sunday Journal
The Myanmar Times, a Burmese weekly news journal (daily newspaper in English)
Premier Eleven Sports Journal
Popular News Journal
Seven Days News or 7 Days News Journal - private weekly newspaper (Burmese)
Seven Days Sports
The Voice Weekly (Burmese)
Weekly Eleven
The Irrawaddy
The Yangon Times
Zay Gwet  (Myanmar Market Journal)
Pyi Myanmar News Journal
Good Health Journal
The Tanintharyi Weekly

Published overseas
Mizzima News Agency
Mandalay Gazette
Freedom News Group

Defunct popular and influential newspapers
The Botataung (Burmese)
Daily Sport Journal
Democracy (ceased publication in 2019)
The Guardian (Burmese and English)
Myanmar Freedom Daily - a private daily newspaper (English) (Last published 2015)
The Nation (Burmese and English)
Phoenix - entertainment weekly, banned from publishing from August 2009 for unspecified reasons
The Worker (Burmese)

See also
 Media of Myanmar

References

Myanmar